Sprengel explosives are a generic class of materials invented by Hermann Sprengel in the 1870s. They consist of stoichiometric mixtures of strong oxidisers and reactive fuels, mixed just prior to use in order to enhance safety. Either the oxidiser or the fuel, or both, should be a liquid to facilitate mixing, and intimate contact between the materials for a fast reaction rate.

Sprengel suggested nitric acid, nitrates and chlorates as oxidisers, and nitroaromatics (e.g. nitrobenzene) as fuels. Other Sprengel explosives used at various times include charcoal with liquid oxygen (an oxyliquit), "Rackarock", and ANFO ammonium nitrate (oxidiser) mixed with a fuel oil (fuel), normally diesel, kerosene, or nitromethane. Eventually ANFO supplanted all others because its oxidiser was the safest, and - due to its widespread use as a fertiliser in agriculture - also the cheapest.

"Rackarock" consisted of potassium chlorate and nitrobenzene. It was provided in the form of permeable cartridges of the chlorate, which were placed in wire baskets and dipped in the nitrobenzene for a few seconds before use. For underwater use, it could be provided in cans instead. It was famously used in the massive submarine demolition of Flood Rock, a navigational hazard in Long Island Sound in 1885. The charge of over a hundred tonnes of explosive (laid in tunnels 20 metres below sea level) destroyed approximately 600,000 tonnes of rock.

See also 
 Cheddite
 Miedziankit
 Oxyliquit
 Panclastite

References 

Explosives